Michael or Mike Ellis may refer to:

Michael Ellis (British politician) (born 1967), British Conservative Member of Parliament for Northampton North
Michael B. Ellis (1894–1937), American soldier and Medal of Honor recipient
Mike Ellis (athlete) (born 1936), English hammer thrower
Mike Ellis (basketball) (born 1958), Australian basketball player 
Mike Ellis (Canadian politician) (born 1973), Canadian provincial politician
Mike Ellis (South African politician) (born 1946), deputy chief whip of South Africa's major opposition party
Michael Ellis (American politician) (1941–2018), member of the Wisconsin Senate
Michael J. Ellis, British playwright and scriptwriter
Michael Ellis (designer) (born 1962), American transportation designer
"Michael Ellis" (Monty Python's Flying Circus episode), episode of British TV series Monty Python's Flying Circus
Michael Ellis (bishop) (1652–1726), English Benedictine
Michael Ellis (attorney), assistant White House counsel
Michael Ellis, founder of the defunct multi-level marketing company Metabolife
 "Michael Ellis", a pseudonym used by J. M. DeMatteis